"Farewell My Love" is a 1963 single by The Temptations for the Gordy (Motown) label. It was the last single that was written and produced by Motown president Berry Gordy for well over a decade, and the last released during the period of the "Original 5" lineup (before member Elbridge "Al" Bryant was fired). It is also noted as the group's last single to miss the Billboard pop chart's Top 40 until 1971's "It's Summer" (and the last to not make it on any U.S. music charts for the next 23 years). Up until now the group was jokingly referred to at this time as the "Hitless Temptations" by the Motown staff, much like their "sister" group, The Supremes, were called the "no-hit Supremes". However, their next single, the Smokey Robinson-produced "The Way You Do the Things You Do", would reach the Top 20 of the U.S. pop chart, breaking the group's streak of being "hitless".

Overview

The song tells of a couple's breakup; the narrator speaks of his lover being untrue to him and that he's leaving her to find "someone who cares / And still be there" for him. This is the third of the small handful of pre-psychedelic era songs the group recorded that had more than two members singing lead at one point; the previous were "Isn't She Pretty" and "Check Yourself". As with "Isn't She Pretty", Paul Williams is the song's main lead, yet the song mainly showcases another group member, in this case Eddie Kendricks, who alternates between his famous falsetto and his natural register (first and second tenor). Bryant's voice is also prominently heard here, delivering harmony solos behind Kendricks' and Williams' leads as well as having brief lead lines on the first two choruses ("To me" and "I'm going cry"). Bass singer Melvin Franklin starts the song with do-wop harmonies and later repeats Williams' line, "Why couldn’t you be true?" at the end of the second verse. Although second tenor/baritone singer and leader Otis Williams doesn't have any solos, he is most heard prominently in the chorus and has some ad-libs in the outro of the song.

Although it did not chart nationally, the song was a regional smash hit in the country's mid-west. This would be the group's final A-side released with Williams as the main lead (although B-side releases "Just Let Me Know", "Baby, Baby I Need You", and "Don't Look Back" would be promoted as if they were), and the final one to feature Bryant's vocals altogether (his voice however would appear on two later B-sides). The next three singles from the group would have Kendricks on lead, and then, beginning with "My Girl", David Ruffin, Bryant's replacement, would become the Temptations' new main lead singer.

Personnel
 Lead  vocals by Paul Williams (verses, bridge), Eddie Kendricks (choruses, outro), Al Bryant (choruses, harmony vocals), and Melvin Franklin (2nd verse, harmony vocals)
 Background vocals by Paul Williams, Eddie Kendricks, Melvin Franklin, Al Bryant, and Otis Williams
 Instrumentation by The Funk Brothers

"May I Have This Dance"

The B-side to "Farewell My Love" was "May I Have This Dance". (recorded on November 2, 1962). Despite speculation by some that the recorded version of this song was led by Elbridge "Al" Bryant (who performed the lead on stage and was originally credited as the track's lead), in fact it features a lead vocal from Eddie Kendricks in which he's singing mostly in his (rarely recorded) natural tenor and not his more familiar falsetto, which is only heard near the song's end. Backing him are fellow members Otis Williams, Paul Williams and Melvin Franklin; Bryant's vocals do not actually appear on this track. It would be the last time a Temptation track involving producer-songwriter Norman Whitfield would appear on a single where neither side would chart. In three years, after a few more B-sides and album fillers for the Temptations, Whitfield would produce the hit "Ain't Too Proud To Beg" and take over as the group's main producer.

Personnel
 Lead vocals by Eddie Kendricks 
 Background vocals by Paul Williams, Melvin Franklin, Al Bryant and Otis Williams
 Written by Norman Whitfield and Janie Bradford
 Produced by Norman Whitfield
 Instrumentation by The Funk Brothers

References

1963 singles
The Temptations songs
Song recordings produced by Berry Gordy
Song recordings produced by Smokey Robinson
Gordy Records singles
Songs written by Berry Gordy
Songs written by Norman Whitfield
Songs written by Janie Bradford
1963 songs